The Registro de Emisiones y Transferencia de Contaminantes (RETC) is Mexico's Pollutant Release and Transfer Register (PRTR), similar to Canada's National Pollutant Release Inventory and the US Toxics Release Inventory.

External links
 Mexico Registro de Emisiones y Transferencia de Contaminantes

Pollutant release inventories and registers
Environment of Mexico